The Township of Esquimalt  is a municipality at the southern tip of Vancouver Island, in British Columbia, Canada.  It is bordered to the east by the provincial capital, Victoria, to the south by the Strait of Juan de Fuca, to the west by Esquimalt Harbour and Royal Roads, to the northwest by the New Songhees 1A Indian reserve and the town of View Royal, and to the north by a narrow inlet of water called the Gorge, across which is the district municipality of Saanich. It is almost tangential to Esquimalt 1 Indian Reserve near Admirals Road. It is one of the 13 municipalities of Greater Victoria and part of the Capital Regional District.

Esquimalt had a population of 17,533 in 2021. It is home to the Pacific fleet of the Royal Canadian Navy.

History
The region now known as Esquimalt was settled by First Nations people approximately 4000 years before the arrival of Europeans.  The treaties of the Hudson's Bay Company (HBC), signed in 1843, refer to these people as the Kosampsom group, though they are now known as the Esquimalt Nation. The word Esquimalt is a transliteration of "Ess-whoy-malth," a phrase usually translated as "place of the shoaling waters."  The Songhees people (then called Songish), who now have a reserve in Esquimalt, were originally located on the western shore of what is now Victoria Harbour, but were relocated in 1911. Both nations spoke a North Straits Salish dialect called Lekwungen (which is also an alternate name for the Songhees).

The first Europeans to reach Esquimalt were the Spanish expedition of Manuel Quimper in Princesa Real in 1790, with Gonzalo López de Haro and Juan Carrasco as pilotos (equivalent to master). Quimper entered and carefully mapped Esquimalt Harbour, which his first mate named Puerto de Córdova after the 46th viceroy of New Spain. Quimper claimed the region for Spain and placed a wooden cross on a hill. When the Spanish returned later that summer the cross had vanished. In 1792 Captain George Vancouver extensively explored the region. Following resolution of the Nootka Crisis, control of the region went to the British and the British owned HBC.

In 1843, near the height of the Oregon Question, the HBC was looking for a new location for its Pacific base of operations. John McLoughlin, the company's chief factor at Fort Vancouver, ordered James Douglas to build a new fort on Vancouver Island.  Douglas liked Esquimalt Harbour, but rejected it as a site for a fort because there were too many trees there. Douglas chose a spot on the eastern shore of Victoria Harbour at the mouth of the Gorge Inlet. He called it Fort Camosun, but later renamed it Fort Victoria in honour of the British Queen.

However, ships continued to use Esquimalt Harbour to load and offload passengers and supplies. In 1852, sailors from a British naval ship, built a trail through the forest linking the harbour with Victoria Harbour and the fort. This trail, since paved over, is now one of Esquimalt's main streets, Old Esquimalt Road.

Meanwhile, the HBC decided to try its hand at farming. Douglas leased all of Vancouver Island for seven shillings a year from Great Britain, and had a division of the HBC, the Puget Sound Agricultural Company, come in to develop the land.  The Viewfield farm was the first in 1850, with the Constance Cove farm and Craigflower farms added later. The Craigflower farmhouse still exists as a heritage site, as does the Craigflower schoolhouse built to serve the settlers' children. Thomas Mackenzie, the bailiff in charge of the farm, named it for the ancestral home of one of his superiors. By the mid-1860s, the farms were considered failures and abandoned, and the property sold off in small parcels.

In 1855, the  British Royal Navy constructed three hospital buildings on the harbour to treat casualties of the Crimean War. A small settlement grew up on the water's edge near the naval installation. In 1858, the discovery of gold on the Fraser River triggered a massive influx of people, who came to Fort Victoria to buy permits and supplies before setting out for the mainland. Many of these ships landed in Esquimalt Harbour. Some of these people stayed in the area, including a few who opened up pubs, as well as some less-than-successful gold miners. With the growing population came the area's first building boom.

Even after the Oregon Treaty of 1846, the boundary between the British Gulf Islands and the U.S. islands in the Strait of Juan de Fuca and Puget Sound was not fully defined.  An incident involving an American settler shooting an HBC farm pig on San Juan Island led to the Pig War with the United States in 1859.

In 1865, the Royal Navy relocated the headquarters of its Pacific fleet from Valparaíso, Chile, to Esquimalt Harbour. In 1887, a military base was located at Work Point. In 1905, the Royal Navy abandoned the area, but the Pacific base of the new Royal Canadian Navy replaced it in 1910. Gradually, naval life and shipbuilding came to dominate the region's sense of identity. On September 1, 1912, Esquimalt was incorporated as a District Municipality. After World War I, it became one of Canada's major shipbuilding capitals. In 1887, the Esquimalt and Nanaimo Railway was built through the centre of town.

In June 2010, the Royal Canadian Navy celebrated its 100th anniversary with a fleet review in the waters off Greater Victoria, by Canada's Governor General Michaëlle Jean. The review was attended by warships from Canada, France, New Zealand, Australia, Japan, the United States, and US and Canadian Coast Guard vessels.

Demographics

Ethnicity

Religion 
According to the 2021 census, religious groups in Esquimalt included:
Irreligion (10,705 persons or 61.9%)
Christianity (5,540 persons or 32.0%)
Buddhism (265 persons or 1.5%)
Islam (150 persons or 0.9%)
Judaism (120 persons or 0.7%)
Hinduism (60 persons or 0.3%)
Sikhism (50 persons or 0.3%)
Indigenous Spirituality (35 persons or 0.2%)

Neighbourhoods of Esquimalt

 Craigflower
 Colville Road
 Gorge Vale Golf
 Esquimalt Village
 Parklands
 Panhandle Alley
 Rock Heights
 Saxe Point
 West Bay
 Work Point (DND)

Although the neighbourhood of Victoria (Vic) West is located on the Esquimalt Peninsula, it is part of the city of Victoria.

Education
Residents are zoned to schools in the Greater Victoria School District.

Communications
In the past, Esquimalt has been served by various incarnations of newspapers. Esquimalt ceased having its own newspaper in 2007 when the Esquimalt News by the Black Press folded and merged with the neighbouring Victoria News.

Esquimalt, however, regained its own local community news source in October 2009 with the creation of the online journal Esquimalt Review.

Canadian Forces Base Esquimalt

Canadian Forces Base Esquimalt (CFB Esquimalt) is home to Maritime Forces Pacific (MARPAC) of the Royal Canadian Navy. The base facility dates back to the fur trade era, before the founding of the Colony of Vancouver Island in 1849. It was first established as a military installation by the Royal Navy in 1855, and has been operated by the Royal Canadian Navy since 1910.

Notes

References

Community Profile: Esquimalt District Municipality, British Columbia; Statistics Canada

External links

District municipalities in British Columbia
Greater Victoria
Hudson's Bay Company trading posts
Populated places in the Capital Regional District
Populated places on the British Columbia Coast
Port cities and towns on the Canadian Pacific coast